Bonilla-Bonillita Lacustrine Wetland is a protected area in Costa Rica, managed under the Caribbean La Amistad Conservation Area and created in 1994 under decree  23004-MlRENEM to protect the Lake Bonilla, Lake Bonillita on the west side of Reventazón River, and Lake Lancaster Arriba and Lake Lancaster Abajo on the east side of Reventazón River.

References 

Nature reserves in Costa Rica
Protected areas established in 1994